The Stade Olympique is a multi-purpose stadium in Nouakchott, Mauritania. It is used mostly for football matches. It also has an athletics track. The capacity has been 20,000 since the most recent renovation. The stadium is used by the Mauritania national football team.

External links

 at cafe.daum.net/stade
Photo at worldstadiums.com
Photos at fussballtempel.net

Football venues in Mauritania
Sports venues in Mauritania
Athletics (track and field) venues in Mauritania
Mauritania
Multi-purpose stadiums in Mauritania
Sport in Nouakchott